Schrankia pelicano is a species of moth of the family Erebidae first described by Oleg Pekarsky in 2012. It is found in Sichuan in south-western China.

The wingspan is 16–17 mm. The ground color of the forewings is grey brown and the hindwings are ochreous grey.

Etymology
The species name refers to the resemblance of the opened male genitalia to a pelican.

References

Moths described in 2012
Hypenodinae